Satar (also Romanized as Saţar) is a city and capital of Kolyai District, in Sonqor County, Kermanshah Province, Iran.  At the 2006 census, its population was 1,284, in 354 families.

References

Populated places in Sonqor County

Cities in Kermanshah Province